Penicillium brunneoconidiatum is a fungus species of the genus of Penicillium.

See also
List of Penicillium species

References

Fungi described in 2014
brunneoconidiatum